World of wonder may refer to:

World of Wonder (company), an independent television and film production company
World of Wonder (magazine), a UK children's magazine 
World of Wonders (novel), the third novel in Robertson Davies' Deptford Trilogy
World of Wonder (anthology), a 1951 anthology of science fiction and fantasy stories edited by Fletcher Pratt
World of Wonders (album), a 1986 album by Bruce Cockburn

Worlds of Wonder may refer to:

Worlds of Wonder (amusement park), an amusement park in Noida, India
Worlds of Wonder (game), a role-playing game
Worlds of Wonder (toy company), a 1980s American toy company
Worlds of Wonder (collection), a 1949 collection science fiction stories by Olaf Stapledon
Worlds of Wonder: How to Write Science Fiction & Fantasy, a book by David Gerrold

See also
Wonders of the World (disambiguation)